The Timpanogos Regional Hospital is a hospital located in Orem, Utah, United States. It is owned and operated by MountainStar Healthcare. The hospital opened in 1998 as a unit of Columbia Hospital Corporation.

Services 
 24/7 emergency care
 MountainStar AirCare Ambulance
 Orthopedics / Joint replacements
 Comprehensive spine care
 Cardiology
 Cardiac catheterization lab
 Cardiac care unit
 Cardiac rehabilitation
 Comprehensive surgical care
 Minimally invasive and robotic surgeries
 Hybrid operating suites
 Critical care
 Maternity care
 24/7 onsite laborioust program
 C-section suites
 Maternal Fetal Medicine
 Level III Neonatal Intensive Care Unit (NICU)
 Only HeRO infant monitor in the state
 Digital webcams connecting NICU babies with parents
 Pediatric and Neonatal care
 Pediatric Inpatient services
 Pediatric Critical care service (PICU) opened August 1, 2017. 
Neonatal Intensive care 
 Women's Wellness Center
 Dedicated women's diagnostic center
 Digital mammography
 Bone densitometry (DEXA) Cancer care
 Brachytherapy
 Comprehensive diagnostic and interventional radiology services
 Comprehensive lab services

Hospital Statistics 
 122 licensed beds

Hospital Accolades and Accreditations 
 Recognized among the nation's 100 Top Hospitals in 2015 and 2016. (Truven Health Analytics 2015–2016)
 Earned recognition as a Top Performer on Key Quality Measures in three reports (The Joint Commission 2012, 2014, and 2015).
 Recognized with the Patient Safety Excellence AwardTM, ranking it among the top five percent in the nation for patient safety (Healthgrades 2013 & 2015)
 Achieved the Get With The Guidelines - Stroke Gold Plus Award (American Stroke Association 2014 & 2015)
 Consistently ranked in the top hospitals nationwide by the American College of Cardiology
 Verified as a Stroke Receiving Facility by the Utah Department of Health
 Designated as an Accredited Chest Pain Center (Society of Cardiovascular Patient Care)

References

External links

 

Hospital buildings completed in 1998
Hospitals in Utah County, Utah
Buildings and structures in Orem, Utah
MountainStar Healthcare